Spinner House is a historic home located at Spinnerstown, Bucks County, Pennsylvania. It was built about 1860, and is a -story, three bay by two bay, frame and brick dwelling with a gable roof and 2-story rear addition. Three sides of the house are covered in shiplap siding, and the fourth in brick. It is in the Italianate style. The interior features notable stencil work.

It was added to the National Register of Historic Places in 1978.

Gallery

References

Houses on the National Register of Historic Places in Pennsylvania
Italianate architecture in Pennsylvania
Houses completed in 1860
Houses in Bucks County, Pennsylvania
National Register of Historic Places in Bucks County, Pennsylvania